Mordellistena grandii is a beetle in the genus Mordellistena of the family Mordellidae. It was described in 1942 by Franciscolo.

References

grandii
Beetles described in 1942